Parkliv! is a live album from Swedish pop group Gyllene Tider, recorded live in Mjölby Folkets Park on 31 July 1981, and released on 3 July 1990, for the CD box Kompakta Tider. A movie with the same title was released the same time.

Track listing
"Tuff tuff tuff (som ett lokomotiv)"
"På jakt efter liv"
"Det hjärta som brinner"
"Tylö Sun"
"Ljudet av ett annat hjärta"
"Flickorna på TV 2"
"Billy"
Presentation av bandet
"(Kom så ska vi) Leva livet"
"Ska vi älska, så ska vi älska till Buddy Holly"
"När vi två blir en"
"När alla vännerna gått hem"

1990 live albums
Gyllene Tider live albums